The 1918 Great Lakes Navy Bluejackets football team represented the Naval Station Great Lakes, the United States Navy's boot camp located near North Chicago, Illinois, in college football during the 1918 college football season.

The team compiled a 7–0–2 record, won the 1919 Rose Bowl, and featured three players (George Halas, Jimmy Conzelman, and Paddy Driscoll) who were later inducted into the Pro Football Hall of Fame.

Charlie Bachman, who was later inducted into the College Football Hall of Fame as a coach, also played for the 1918 Great Lakes team. Bachman at center, and the two guards, captain Emmett Keefe and Jerry Jones, were all former players for Notre Dame. Both ends came from Illinois, Halas and Dick Reichle. Hugh Blacklock and Conrad L. Eklund were at tackle.

The team's backfield was Driscoll, Hal Erickson, Lawrence Eileson, and Blondy Reeves.

Schedule

Season summary

Radio School 
The team beat the Radio School 26–0.

Iowa
On September 28, 1918, Iowa was beaten 10–0, before a crowd of 4,000 in Iowa City. Walter Eckersall in the Chicago Tribune called it "one of the best early games seen in the west in the last decade."

Illinois
Great Lakes beat Illinois 7–0. Great Lakes scored a touchdown in the first quarter, and both teams were held scoreless thereafter. Paddy Driscoll returned the kickoff at the start of the second half for 65 yards.

Northwestern
On October 26, 1918, Northwestern was fought to a scoreless tie before a crowd of 15,000. The game was played in mud that was ankle deep.

Notre Dame
First-year head coach Knute Rockne and Notre Dame also fought to a tie, in front of the largest crowd ever assembled at Cartier Field.

Rutgers
On November 16, 1918, Driscoll scored six touchdowns, including an 80-yard run, and kicked five extra points in the Naval Station's 54–14 victory over a Rutgers team starring Paul Robeson. Rutgers had a strong season up to that point. Walter Camp called it "the most startling reversal of form that has been seen on any foot ball field."

Navy
Navy was leading 6–0 late in the game. Bill Ingram fumbled at the 10-yard line, and Great Lakes Harry Eielson picked up the ball and ran for the goal. He crossed midfield, and Gil Dobie muttered "Tackle him" to nobody in particular. A substitute lineman came off the sidelines and tackled Eielson, who was awarded with a touchdown.

Purdue
Against Purdue, Great Lakes led, 6–0, at halftime, but scored 21 points in the third quarter to extend its lead. Purdue made just two first downs.

Postseason

Rose Bowl
Great Lakes Navy won the Rose Bowl over Mare Island. George Halas was the game's MVP.

References

Great Lakes Navy
Great Lakes Navy Bluejackets football seasons
Rose Bowl champion seasons
Great Lakes Navy Bluejackets football